Midnight Rendezvous is an EP by the British heavy metal band Tokyo Blade, released in 1984 through the UK independent record label Powerstation Records. The songs were recorded in early 1983 when the band was called Genghis Khan and originally released as double 7" single "Double Dealin".

The four tracks of the EP, combined with four tracks of the band's first album, Tokyo Blade, were published as an LP during the same year by Combat Records in the USA, under the title Midnight Rendezvous. This EP was included in the re-release on CD of the album Tokyo Blade in 1997.

Track listing
Music by Andy Boulton, lyrics by Alan Marsh
 "Midnight Rendezvous" – 3:22
 "Mean Streak" – 4:44
 "If Heaven Is Hell" – 6:00
 "Highway Passion" – 4:24

US edition LP
 "Midnight Rendezvous" - 3:22
 "Break the Chains" - 5:07
 "If Heaven Is Hell" - 6:04
 "Mean Streak" - 4:44
 "Powergame" - 4:12
 "Highway Passion" - 4:24
 "Killer City" - 5:47
 "Sunrise in Tokyo" - 5:47

Personnel

Tokyo Blade
 Alan Marsh – lead vocals
 Andy Boulton – guitar
 Ray Dismore– guitar
 Andy Robbins – bass guitar
 Steve Pierce – drums

Additional musicians
 John Wiggins  – guitar on tracks 2, 5, 7 and 8 of the US LP

References

1984 albums
Tokyo Blade albums
Combat Records albums
1984 EPs